The white-faced ibis (Plegadis chihi) is a wading bird in the ibis family, Threskiornithidae.

This species breeds colonially in marshes, usually nesting in bushes or low trees. Its breeding range extends from the western United States south through Mexico, as well as from southeastern Brazil and southeastern Bolivia south to central Argentina, and along the coast of central Chile. Its winter range extends from southern California and Louisiana south to include the rest of its breeding range.

Description
The white-faced ibis is very similar to the glossy ibis in its non-breeding plumages, but it tends to be slightly smaller and the plumage color is somewhat warmer. Breeding adults have a pink bare face bordered with white feathers (rather than a bluish bare face with no bordering feathers), a grey bill, and brighter colored, redder legs. Adults have red eyes year-round, whereas glossy ibises have dark eyes. Juveniles of the two species are nearly identical.

Measurements:

 Length: 18.1-22.1 in (46-56 cm)
 Weight: 15.9-18.5 oz (450-525 g)
 Wingspan: 35.4-36.6 in (90-93 cm)

Distribution
The white-faced ibis occurs in Canada, the United States, Central America and the southern half of South America.  In 2012, the total population size was estimated to be 1.2 million individuals, and increasing. The IUCN rates it as being of Least Concern.

Migration between North and South America does not occur. Within North America, birds breeding in northern areas of the range move south to wintering areas. For example, breeders in northern California and southern Oregon move to wintering areas in southern California and Mexico.

Origin
The white-faced ibis bears a strong resemblance to the related glossy ibis, and in the past was sometimes considered to be a subspecies of the glossy ibis. Another theory was that a small population of glossy ibis dispersed to the Americas, which became isolated and evolved into a separate species. However, recent molecular phylogenetic studies show that the white-faced ibis may actually be paraphyletic. In fact, members of the white-faced ibis populations in the United States appear to be more closely related to glossy ibises than to members of white-faced ibis populations in Southern Brazil.

Feeding
The white-faced ibis eats a variety of organisms, including many invertebrates such as insects, leeches, snails, crayfish and earthworms. It may also eat vertebrates such as fish, newts, and frogs. Its feeding style is to use its bill to probe for prey.

Breeding and nesting

This species breeds colonially in marshes, usually nesting in bushes or low trees. Its breeding range extends from the western United States south through Mexico, as well as from southeastern Brazil and southeastern Bolivia south to central Argentina, and along the coast of central Chile. Its winter range extends from southern California and Louisiana south to include the rest of its breeding range.
The white-faced ibis chooses to nest in the parts of a marsh with dense vegetation  such as bulrush, cattails, shrubs and short trees. It will then build a nest from reeds. The white-faced ibis usually lays three or four blue-green eggs at a time.

Lifespan
White-faced ibises in captivity live up to fourteen years on average. In the wild, white-faced ibises usually live for nine years; however the oldest recorded wild white-faced ibis lived for fourteen years and six months.

Threats
In the past, the white-faced ibis faced many threats from humans. Studies completed in Utah in the 1960s (before this species was added to the Migratory Bird Treaty Act) showed that 82.9% of recorded deaths in banded birds were a result of being shot. However, the main causes of decline of this species previously were pesticides and habitat destruction. The pesticide DDT caused eggshells to be so thin and fragile that parent white-faced ibises crushed the eggs when they were incubating them. Also, since this species is so dependent on wetlands and marshes for both feeding and nesting, changes to water systems such as pollution and man-made draining of water habitats had devastating impacts on members of this species in the past. In order to correct these damages, DDT was banned in 1970 and various programs were created to better maintain and protect wetland nesting habitats. Yet, there is still some debate as to whether or not populations of white-faced ibises in all geographic areas are recovered and growing.

References

External links 

 White-faced Ibis - Cornell Lab of Ornithology
 White-faced ibis Plegadis chihi - USGS Patuxent Bird Identification InfoCenter
 
 
 

white-faced ibis
Wading birds
Birds of the Americas
Native birds of the Western United States
Birds of the Rio Grande valleys
Birds of Mexico
Birds of Argentina
Birds of Bolivia
Birds of Brazil
Birds of Chile
Birds of Paraguay
Birds of Uruguay
white-faced ibis
white-faced ibis